The Boltzmann Medal (or Boltzmann Award) is a prize awarded to physicists that obtain new results concerning statistical mechanics; it is named after the celebrated physicist Ludwig Boltzmann. The Boltzmann Medal is awarded once every three years by the Commission on Statistical Physics of the International Union of Pure and Applied Physics, during the STATPHYS conference.

The award consists of a gilded medal; its front carries the inscription Ludwig Boltzmann, 1844–1906.

Winners
All the winners are influential physicists or mathematicians whose contribution to statistical physics have been relevant in the past decades. Institution with multiple recipients are Sapienza University of Rome (3) and École Normale Supérieure, Cornell University, University of Cambridge and Princeton University (2).
2022  Deepak Dhar (IISER Pune) and John J. Hopfield (Princeton University)
 2019 Herbert Spohn (Technical University Munich)
 2016 Daan Frenkel (University of Cambridge) and Yves Pomeau (University of Arizona and École Normale Supérieure)
 2013 Giovanni Jona-Lasinio (Sapienza University of Rome) and Harry Swinney (University of Texas at Austin)
 2010 John Cardy (University of Oxford) and Bernard Derrida (École Normale Supérieure)
 2007 Kurt Binder (University of Mainz) and Giovanni Gallavotti (Sapienza University of Rome)
 2004 E.G.D. Cohen (Rockefeller University) and H. Eugene Stanley (Boston University)
 2001 Berni Alder (University of California at Davis) and Kyozi Kawasaki (Chubu University)
 1998 Elliott Lieb (Princeton University) and Benjamin Widom (Cornell University)
 1995 Sam F. Edwards (University of Cambridge)
 1992 Joel Lebowitz (Rutgers University) and Giorgio Parisi (Sapienza University of Rome)
 1989 Leo Kadanoff (University of Chicago)
 1986 David Ruelle (Institut des Hautes Études Scientifiques) and Yakov G. Sinai (Moscow State University)
 1983 Michael E. Fisher (University of Maryland, College Park)
 1980 Rodney J. Baxter (Australian National University)
 1977 Ryogo Kubo (University of Tokyo)
 1975 Kenneth G. Wilson (Cornell University)

See also

 List of physics awards

References

External links
IUPAP Commission on Statistical Physics (C3) the official website of C3, the Boltzmann Award recipients list during 1975–2010

Physics awards
Statistical mechanics
Triennial events